Lesley Schiff (born 1951) is an American artist. Schiff studied painting at the Art Institute of Chicago before developing her signature practice using color laser printers to create images. Her work is included in the collections of the Whitney Museum of American Art, the Mead Art Museum and the Metropolitan Museum of Art.

References

1951 births
Living people
20th-century American women artists
20th-century American artists
21st-century American women artists
21st-century American artists
School of the Art Institute of Chicago alumni